Barbara Rhoades (born March 23, 1946) is an American actress, known primarily for her comedy and mystery roles, especially as lady bandit Penelope "Bad Penny" Cushings in The Shakiest Gun in the West (1968). She had a recurring role on Soap, as Maggie Chandler, Jodie Dallas's future wife.

Early years 
Born and raised  in Poughkeepsie, New York, Rhoades is the daughter of Sherry Rhoades. She attended Our Lady of Lourdes High School. She began taking dancing lessons when she was 7 years old.

Career
Rhoades began acting in the late 1960s, appearing in guest roles on several  television series, including  It Takes a Thief, Ironside, Mannix, McMillan & Wife,  Columbo, Kojak, Starsky & Hutch, Alias Smith and Jones, Love, American Style, The Odd Couple, The Six Million Dollar Man, Bewitched, Maude, Trapper John, M.D.,The Partridge Family, Murder, She Wrote and Law & Order. She was a regular cast member of the 1977 situation comedy Busting Loose, portraying Melody Feebeck, and in 1989, as Jessica Gardner on Generations

In 1967, Rhoades signed a long-term exclusive contract with Universal Pictures.

Rhoades appeared in a number of  films during  the 1970s, including There Was a Crooked Man... (1970), opposite Kirk Douglas and Henry Fonda, and Up the Sandbox (1972) starring Barbra Streisand. She played a police officer, "No Balls" Hadley, in 1977's The Choirboys and a Las Vegas hooker who picks up Art Carney along the road during his Oscar-winning performance in Harry and Tonto (1974). She also had roles in Scream Blacula Scream (1973) and The Goodbye Girl (1977) and was a frequent panelist on the popular 1970s game show Match Game, hosted by Gene Rayburn. In 2007, she appeared in First Born with Elisabeth Shue.

In 2011, she had a recurring role on the American soap opera One Life to Live as Irene Manning, childhood best friend of Victoria Lord (Erika Slezak).

For 18 months on Broadway, Rhoades had the role of a showgirl in the musical Funny Girl (1964). She gained other stage experience in summer stock productions at the Cecilwood Theater in Fishkill, New York.

Personal life
Rhoades married Bernie Orenstein, a television producer.

Filmography

References

External links
 
 

1946 births
Living people
Actresses from New York (state)
American film actresses
American soap opera actresses
American television actresses
People from Poughkeepsie, New York
20th-century American actresses
21st-century American actresses